Shri Angalamman College of Engineering and Technology is an educational institute located in the city of Tiruchirapalli in Tamil Nadu, India. It offers various courses leading to Bachelor of Engineering and Technology degrees. The college is affiliated with Anna University and is ISO 9001-2000 certified.

Campus

The campus is full of neem trees.  Which is good for our health.

Courses offered

 B.E in Mechanical Engineering (Mech)
 B.E in Electronics & Communication (ECE)
 B.E in Computer Science (CS)
 B.E in Electronics & Instrumentation E&I)
 B.Tech in Information Technology (I.T)
 B.E in Civil Engineering(VIP)
 B.E in Electrical and Electronics Engineering(EEE)

See also

 List of colleges in Trichy

External links
 Official website

Engineering colleges in Tamil Nadu
Universities and colleges in Tiruchirappalli
Colleges affiliated to Anna University
Educational institutions established in 1991
1991 establishments in Tamil Nadu